Maurice Gerard Smith is a Canadian politician, who was elected to the Nova Scotia House of Assembly in a by-election on October 20, 2009. He represented the electoral district of Antigonish as a member of the Nova Scotia New Democratic Party from 2009 to 2013.

On May 30, 2012, Smith was appointed to the Executive Council of Nova Scotia as  Minister of Transportation and Infrastructure Renewal.

In the 2013 election, Smith was defeated by Liberal Randy Delorey.

References

Living people
Members of the Executive Council of Nova Scotia
Nova Scotia New Democratic Party MLAs
People from Antigonish, Nova Scotia
21st-century Canadian politicians
Year of birth missing (living people)